is a Japanese football player. He plays for FC Tokyo.

Career
Ryoichi Imamura joined J1 League club FC Tokyo in 2017.

References

External links

2000 births
Living people
Association football people from Kanagawa Prefecture
Japanese footballers
J1 League players
J3 League players
FC Tokyo players
FC Tokyo U-23 players
Association football forwards